
The following is a list of Playboy Playmates of 2010.
Playboy magazine names its Playmate of the Month each month throughout the year.

January

Jaime Faith Edmondson (born December 30, 1978) is an American model. She is the Playboy Playmate of the Month for January 2010. Edmondson is a 2002 graduate of Florida Atlantic University with a degree in Criminal Justice. She is a former police officer and Miami Dolphins cheerleader.  Edmondson and fellow Miami Dolphins cheerleader Cara Rosenthal appeared on The Amazing Race 14, finishing in second place, and returned in The Amazing Race 18 as the third team eliminated.  Edmondson and baseball player Evan Longoria were married on December 31, 2015. The couple has one daughter, born in 2013.

February

Heather Rae Young (born September 16, 1987)  is an American model and was the Playboy Playmate of the Month for February 2010. Since her time as Playmate she has had a role in eight films including 2014; Love in the Time of Monsters.  Young is also a real estate agent, obtaining her real estate license in 2014. Her work is showcased in Selling Sunset, a Netflix reality television show focused on The Oppenheim Group, a real estate brokerage dealing in luxury homes in the Los Angeles area.  In October 2021, she married fellow real estate agent and flipper, Tarek El Moussa. They announced in July 2022 their first baby is on the way due early 2023.  Young and El Moussa conceived through IVF, and have stated that they may have more children in the near future. Their son was born on January 31, 2023.

March

Kyra Milan (born November 2, 1989) is the Playboy Playmate of the Month for March 2010.

April

Amy Leigh Andrews   is an internationally published cover model, centerfold and former Playboy Playmate. Andrews has continually expanded her career, appearing in numerous magazines, including FHM and Maxim, as well as modeling for various brands such as Soleil Organics Skincare and Beach Bunny Swimwear. In addition to modeling, Andrews focuses on social media marketing and brand ambassadorship to help align companies with their target audiences.

May

Kassie Lyn Logsdon (born January 6, 1987)  is the Playboy Playmate of the Month for May 2010.

June

Katie Vernola (born October 21, 1991)  is the Playboy Playmate of the Month for June 2010.  She is the first Playmate born in the 1990s. Vernola has since joined the world of short course off-road racing, having competed in the Lucas Oil Off Road Racing Series.

July

Shanna Marie McLaughlin (born May 10, 1985) is the Playboy Playmate of the Month for July 2010. She won her spot as a Playmate by winning the Playboy TV show Playboy Shootout.

August

Francesca Frigo (born March 22, 1986) is the Playboy Playmate of the Month for August 2010.

September

Olivia Paige (born May 22, 1991)  is the Playboy Playmate of the Month for September 2010.  Her centerfold was photographed by Arny Freytag. Prior to being chosen as a Playmate, she was runner-up in the reality show Playboy Shootout.

October

Claire Sinclair (born May 25, 1991) is the Playboy Playmate of the Month for October 2010. Her centerfold was photographed by Stephen Wayda. She is also the 2011 Playmate of the Year.

November

Shera Bechard (born September 14, 1983) is the Playboy Playmate of the Month for November 2010. Her centerfold was photographed by Stephen Wayda. Bechard starred in the 2009 film Sweet Karma. Bechard became a resident of the United States in 2012 as a recipient of the EB-1 visa, also known as the Einstein visa, for workers with "extraordinary abilities". In April 2018, The Wall Street Journal reported she had an affair with married Republican fundraiser Elliott Broidy, got pregnant by him, aborted the fetus, and was paid $1.6 million in hush money to stay quiet. On July 6, 2018, she filed a lawsuit against Broidy and the attorney Michael Avenatti, in relation to the cessation of the settlement payments. Bechard has alleged in a complaint that Broidy was physically, sexually, and emotionally abusive of her, and that he exposed her to herpes. Broidy has denied the allegations.

December

Ashley Hobbs (born September 3, 1989) is the Playboy Playmate of the Month for December 2010. Her centerfold was photographed by Arny Freytag.

See also
 List of people in Playboy 2010–2019

References

2010-related lists
 2010
Playmates of 2010